Mahan was a loose confederacy of statelets that existed from around the 1st century BC to 5th century AD in the southern Korean peninsula in the Chungcheong and Jeolla provinces.  Arising out of the confluence of Gojoseon migration and the Jin state federation, Mahan was one of the Samhan ("Three Hans"), along with Byeonhan and Jinhan. Baekje began as a member statelet, but later overtook all of Mahan and became one of the Three Kingdoms of Korea.

History
Mahan probably developed from the existing bronze society of third to second centuries BC, continuing to absorb migration from the north in subsequent centuries. King Jun of the kingdom of Gija Joseon in northern Korea, having lost the throne to Wiman, fled to the state of Jin in southern Korea around 194 - 180 BC. He and his followers are thought to have established a base within Jin territory. It is not certain whether Mahan conquered or arose out of this entity, but Mahan was certainly influenced by this influx of northern culture. 

Further migration followed the fall of Wiman Joseon and establishment of the  Chinese commanderies in the Korean Peninsula region in 108 BC. It is described in the Chinese chronicle San Guo Zhi and the much later Korean chronicles Samguk Yusa and Samguk Sagi.

In the 1st century AD, the Wolji/Mokji (月支/目支) state, that formed and led Mahan confederacy, was defeated in struggles with Baekje, another member of Mahan, and consequently losing whole region of present-day Han River basin. But the San Guo Zhi recorded the Han state fallen in struggles with the Lelang Commandery and Daifang Commandery in the 246. Under continuous pressure from Baekje, only 20 statelets of Mahan confederacy survived until the late 3rd century. Baekje eventually absorbed or conquered all of Mahan by the 5th century, growing into one of the Three Kingdoms of Korea, along with Silla and Goguryeo.

Politics
Kings of Mahan occasionally called themselves "King of Jin," referring to the earlier Jin state and asserting nominal sovereignty over all of Samhan. A wealth of bronze artifacts and production facilities indicate that Mahan was probably the earliest developed of the three Hans.  At its height, Mahan covered much of the Han River Basin and the modern-day provinces of Gyeonggi, Chungcheong, and Jeolla, although political unity was strongest led by Mokji state (목지국, 目支國) in Cheonan, Chungcheong.

Culture

Legacy
Goryeo historians identified Mahan with Goguryeo, which was supported by their works like Samguk Sagi, Samguk Yusa and Jewang Ungi. That historical view was previously given by Choe Chiwon, a noted Confucian scholar and historian in the late  Silla period. Apart from the geographical location of Mahan, the Chinese historical record History of Song defines the ethnical origin of the Jeong-an kingdom, a successor state of Balhae, as Mahan. 

In the late Joseon period, that historical notion came under criticism by early Silhak scholar Han Baek-gyeom, who emphasized the linkage between Mahan and Baekje in terms of the geographical location.

Monarchs of Mahan confederacy

Statelets
According to the San Guo Zhi, Mahan consisted of 54 statelets of up to ten thousand families each:

 Gamhae (감해국, 感奚國), present-day Iksan.
 Gamhaebiri (감해비리국, 監奚卑離國), present-day Hongseong.
 Geonma (건마국, 乾馬國), present-day Iksan.
 Gorap (고랍국, 古臘國), present-day Namwon.
 Gori (고리국, 古離國), present-day Iksan.
 Gobiri (고비리국, 古卑離國), present-day Yangpyeong or Yeoju.
 Gowon (고원국, 古爰國)
 Gotanja (고탄자국, 古誕者國)
 Gopo (고포국, 古蒲國), present-day Buyeo County.
 Guro (구로국, 狗盧國), present-day Cheongyang.
 Gusaodan (구사오단국, 臼斯烏旦國), present-day Jangseong.
 Guso (구소국, 狗素國), present-day Jeongeup.
 Guhae (구해국, 狗奚國), present-day Gangjin.
 Naebiri (내비리국, 內卑離國)
 Noram (노람국, 怒藍國)
 Daeseoksak (대석삭국, 大石索國), present-day Yangju or Ganghwa Island.
 Mangno (막로국, 莫盧國)
 Mallo (만로국, 萬盧國), present-day Boryeong or Gunsan.
 Morobiri (모로비리국, 牟盧卑離國), present-day Gochang.
 Mosu (모수국, 牟水國), present-day Suwon.
 Mokji (목지국, 目支國), present-day Cheonan.
 Baekje (백제국, 百濟國), present-day Seoul.
 Byeokbiri (벽비리국, 辟卑離國), present-day Gimje.
 Bulmi (불미국, 不彌國), present-day Naju.
 Bulsabunsa (불사분사국, 不斯濆邪國), present-day Jeonju.
 Burun (불운국, 不雲國), present-day Gongju or Boseong.
 Biri (비리국, 卑離國), present-day Gunsan.
 Bimi (비미국, 卑彌國), present-day Seocheon.
 Saro (사로국, 駟盧國), present-day Hongseong.
 Sangoe (상외국, 桑外國), present-day Hwaseong.
 Soseoksak (소석삭국, 小石索國), present-day Gyodong Island.
 Sowigeon (소위건국, 素謂乾國), present-day Boryeong.
 Songnobulsa (속로불사국, 速盧不斯國), present-day Gimpo.
 Sinbunhwal (신분활국, 臣濆活國), present-day Anseong or Gapyeong.
 Sinsodo (신소도국, 臣蘇塗國), present-day Taean.
 Sinunsin (신운신국, 臣雲新國), present-day Cheonan.
 Sinheun (신흔국, 臣釁國), present-day Daejeon or Asan.
 Arim (아림국, 兒林國), present-day Seocheon or Yesan.
 Yeoraebiri (여래비리국, 如來卑離國), present-day Iksan.
 Yeomno (염로국, 冉路國), present-day Asan.
 Uhyumotak (우휴모탁국, 優休牟涿國), present-day Bucheon.
 Wonyang (원양국, 爰襄國), present-day Hwaseong or Paju.
 Wonji (원지국, 爰池國), present-day Yeosu.
 Illan (일난국, 一難國)
 Illi (일리국, 一離國)
 Irhwa (일화국, 日華國)
 Imsoban (임소반국, 臨素半國), present-day Gunsan.
 Jarimoro (자리모로국, 咨離牟盧國), present-day Icheon.
 Jiban (지반국, 支半國), present-day Buan.
 Jichim (지침국, 支侵國), present-day Eumseong.
 Cheomno (첩로국, 捷盧國), present-day Jeongeup.
 Chori (초리국, 楚離國), present-day Goheung.
 Chosandobiri (초산도비리국, 楚山塗卑離國), present-day Jindo County.
 Chiriguk (치리국국, 致利鞠國), present-day Seocheon.

See also
History of Korea

References

Ancient peoples
Baekje
Early Korean history
Former countries in Korean history
1st-century BC establishments
3rd-century disestablishments
Former confederations